Yle Nyheter is the Swedish language online news service of the Finnish national broadcaster Yleisradio (Yle). Generally speaking it is only updated during the daytime hours (i.e. no new stories are added during the night, unless there is an exceptional event). Until August 2007, the service was called Internytt.

See also 
TV-nytt

References

External links 
https://svenska.yle.fi

Finnish news websites
Yle
Swedish-language websites